Macaranga congestiflora is a species of plant in the family Euphorbiaceae. It is endemic to the Philippines.

References

Flora of the Philippines
congestiflora
Taxonomy articles created by Polbot
Taxa named by Elmer Drew Merrill